Many letters of the Latin alphabet, both capital and small, are used in mathematics, science, and engineering to denote by convention specific or abstracted constants, variables of a certain type, units, multipliers, or physical entities. Certain letters, when combined with special formatting, take on special meaning.

Below is an alphabetical list of the letters of the alphabet with some of their uses. The field in which the convention applies is mathematics unless otherwise noted.

Aa
A represents:
the first point of a triangle
the digit "10" in hexadecimal and other positional numeral systems with a radix of 11 or greater
the unit ampere for electric current in physics
the area of a figure
the mass number or nucleon number of an element in chemistry
the Helmholtz free energy of a closed thermodynamic system of constant pressure and temperature
a vector potential, in electromagnetics it can refer to the magnetic vector potential
an Abelian group in abstract algebra
the Glaisher–Kinkelin constant
atomic weight, denoted by Ar 
work in classical mechanics
the pre-exponential factor in the Arrhenius Equation
electron affinity
 represents the algebraic numbers or affine space in algebraic geometry.
a represents:
the first side of a triangle (opposite point A)
the scale factor of the expanding universe in cosmology
the acceleration in mechanics equations
the x-intercept of a line using the line equation
the unit are for area (100 m2)
the unit prefix atto (10−18)
the first term in a sequence or series

Bb
B represents:
the digit "11" in hexadecimal and other positional numeral systems with a radix of 12 or greater
the second point of a triangle
a ball (also denoted by ℬ or )
 a basis of a vector space or of a filter (both also denoted by ℬ)
 in econometrics and time-series statistics it is often used for the backshift or lag operator, the formal parameter of the lag polynomial
the magnetic field, denoted  or 
B with various subscripts represents several variations of Brun's constant and Betti numbers; it can also be used to mean the Bernoulli numbers.
b represents:
the second side of a triangle (opposite point B)
the impact parameter in nuclear scattering
the y-intercept of a line using the line equation
usually with an index, sometimes with an arrow over it, a basis vector
a breadth
the molality of a solution

Cc
 C represents:
 the third point of a triangle
 the digit "12" in hexadecimal and other positional numeral systems with a radix of 13 or greater
 the unit coulomb of electrical charge
 capacitance in electrical theory
 with indices denoting the number of combinations, a binomial coefficient
 together with a degree symbol (°), the Celsius measurement of temperature = °C
 the circumference of a circle or other closed curve
 the complement of a set (lowercase c and the symbol ∁ are also used)
 an arbitrary category
 the number concentration
  represents the set of complex numbers.
 A vertically elongated C with an integer subscript n sometimes denotes the n-th coefficient of a formal power series.
 c represents:
 the unit prefix centi (10−2)
 the amount concentration in chemistry
 the speed of light in vacuum
 the third side of a triangle (opposite corner C)
 Lowercase Fraktur  denotes the cardinality of the set of real numbers (the "continuum"), or, equivalently, of the power set of natural numbers.

Dd
D represents 
the digit "13" in hexadecimal and other positional numeral systems with a radix of 14 or greater
diffusion coefficient or diffusivity in dimensions of [distance2/time]
the differential operator in Euler's calculus notation
dissociation energy
Dimension
d represents
the differential operator
the unit day of time (86,400 s)
the difference in an arithmetic sequence
a metric operator/function
the diameter of a circle
the unit prefix deci (10−1)
a thickness
a distance

Ee
E represents:
the digit "14" in hexadecimal and other positional numeral systems with a radix of 15 or greater
an exponent in decimal numbers. For example, 1.2E3 is 1.2×103 or 1200
the set of edges in a graph or matroid
the unit prefix exa (1018)
energy in physics
electric field denoted  or 
 electromotive force (denoted  and measured in volts), refers to voltage
an event (as in P(E), which reads "the probability P of event E occurring")
in statistics, the expected value of a random variable, sometimes as 
Ek represents kinetic energy
 (Arrhenius) activation energy, denoted Ea or EA
 ionization energy, denoted Ei
 electron affinity, denoted Eea
 dissociation energy, denoted Ed
e represents:
Euler's number, a transcendental number equal to 2.71828182845... which is used as the base for natural logarithms
a vector of unit length, especially in the direction of one of the coordinates axes
the elementary charge in physics
an electron, usually denoted e− to distinguish against a positron e+
the eccentricity of a conic section
the identity element in a group

Ff
F represents
the digit "15" in hexadecimal and other positional numeral systems with a radix of 16 or greater
the unit farad of electrical capacity
the Helmholtz free energy of a closed thermodynamic system of constant pressure and temperature
 together with a degree symbol (°) represents the Fahrenheit measurement of temperature = °F
F represents
force in mechanics equations
pFq is a hypergeometric series
the probability distribution function in statistics
a Fibonacci number
 an arbitrary functor
 a field
 an event space sigma algebra as part of a probability space, often as 
f represents:
the unit prefix femto (10−15)
f represents:
the generic designation of a function

Gg
G represents
an arbitrary graph, as in: G(V,E)
an arbitrary group
the unit prefix giga (109)
the Newtonian constant of gravitation
the Einstein tensor
the Gibbs energy
the centroid of a triangle
Catalan's constant
weight measured in newtons
g represents:
the generic designation of a second function
the acceleration due to gravity on Earth
a unit of mass, the gramme

Hh
H represents:
a Hilbert space
the unit henry of magnetic inductance
the homology and cohomology functor
the enthalpy
the (Shannon) entropy of information
the orthocenter of a triangle
a partial sum of the harmonic series
magnetic field, denoted 
the Hamilton function
H0 represents Hubble's parameter as measured today (100 h km·s−1·Mpc−1), with h being the associated error.
 represents the quaternions (after William Rowan Hamilton).
ΔH‡ represents the standard enthalpy of activation in the Eyring equation.
ℋ represents the Hamiltonian in Hamiltonian mechanics.
h represents:
the class number in algebraic number theory
a small increment in the argument of a function
the unit hour for time (3600 s)
the Planck constant (6.626 069(57)× 10−34 J·s)
the unit prefix hecto (10)
the generic designation of a third function
the altitude of a triangle
a height

Ii
I represents:
the closed unit interval, which contains all real numbers from 0 to 1, inclusive
the identity matrix
the Irradiance
the moment of inertia
intensity in physics
the incenter of a triangle
the electric current
ionization energy, denoted I
I represents:
 the index of an indexed family
i represents:
the imaginary unit, a complex number that is the square root of −1
a subscript to denote the ith term (that is, a general term or index) in a sequence or list
the index to the elements of a vector, written as a subscript after the vector name
the index to the rows of a matrix, written as the first subscript after the matrix name
an index of summation using the sigma notation
the unit vector in Cartesian coordinates going in the X-direction, usual bold i

Jj
J represents:
the unit joule of energy
the current density in electromagnetism denoted 
the radiosity in thermal mechanics
the moment of inertia
J represents:
 the scheme of a diagram in category theory
j represents:
the index to the columns of a matrix, written as the second subscript after the matrix name
in electrical engineering, the square root of −1, instead of i
in electrical engineering, the principal cube root of 1:

Kk
K represents:
the temperature unit kelvin
the functors of K-theory
an unspecified (real) constant
a field in algebra
the area of a polygon
kinetic energy
k represents
 the unit prefix kilo- (103)
 the Boltzmann constant, this is often represented as kB to avoid confusion with
 the wavenumber of the wave equation
 an integer, e.g. a dummy variable in summations, or an index of a matrix
 an unspecified (real) constant
 the spring constant of Hooke's law
 the spacetime curvature from the Friedmann equations in cosmology
 the rate constant (coefficient)

Ll
L represents:
length, used often in quantum mechanics as the size of an infinite square well
angular momentum
the unit of volume the litre
the radiance
the space of all integrable real (or complex) functions
the space of linear maps, as in L(E,F) or L(E) = End(E)
the likelihood function
a formal language
the lag operator in statistics
a Lucas number
the Lagrange function
l represents:
the unit of volume the litre
the length of a side of a rectangle or a cuboid (e.g. V = lwh; A = lw)
the last term of a sequence or series (e.g. Sn = n(a+l)/2)
the orbital angular momentum quantum number
ℒ represents:
the Lagrangian (sometimes just L)
exposure (in particle physics)

Mm
M represents:
 a manifold
 a metric space
 a matroid
the unit prefix mega- (106)
 the Madelung constant for crystal structures held by ionic bonding
 the moment of force
 molar mass
 molar mass constant, denoted Mu
 relative molecular mass, denoted Mr 
m represents:
the number of rows in a matrix
atomic mass
atomic mass constant denoted mu
the slope in a linear regression or in any line
the mass in mechanics equations
the unit metre of length
the unit prefix milli (10−3)
a median of a triangle
the overall order of reaction

Nn
N represents
the unit newton of force
the nine-point center of a triangle
N represents
the neutron number
The number of particles of a thermodynamical system
NA represents the Avogadro constant
 represents the natural numbers.
n represents
the unit prefix nano (10−9)
n represents
the number of columns in a matrix
the "number of" in algebraic equations
the number density of particles in a volume
the index of the nth term of a sequence or series (e.g. tn = a + (n − 1)d)
the principal quantum number
the amount of a given substance
the number concentration
the overall order of reaction

Oo
O represents
the order of asymptotic behavior of a function (upper bound); see Big O notation
 — the origin of the coordinate system in Cartesian coordinates
the circumcenter of a triangle or other cyclic polygon, or more generally the center of a circle
o represents
the order of asymptotic behavior of a function (strict upper bound); see Little o notation
the order of an element in a group

Pp
P represents:
the pressure in physics equations
the unit prefix peta (1015)
probability in statistics and statistical mechanics
an arbitrary point in geometry
power in watts
weight measured in newtons
 represents
the prime numbers
projective space
a probability (as in P(E), which reads "the probability P of event E happening")
p represents
the unit prefix pico (10−12)
a proton, often p+ or p
the linear momentum in physics equations
the perimeter of a triangle or other polygon
generalized momentum
the pressure in physics equations

Qq
Q represents:
 heat energy
 electroweak charge, denoted QW
 represents the rational numbers
q represents:
 the deceleration parameter in cosmology
 electric charge of a particle
 a generalized coordinate

Rr
R represents:
the Ricci tensor
the circumradius of a cyclic polygon such as a triangle
an arbitrary relation
r represents:
the radius of a circle or sphere
the inradius of a triangle or other tangential polygon
the ratio of a geometric series (e.g. arn−1)
the separation of two objects, for example in Coulomb's law
a position vector
the rate of concentration change of B (due to chemical reaction) denoted rB

Ss
S represents
a sum
the unit siemens of electric conductance
the unit sphere (with superscript denoting dimension)
the scattering matrix
 entropy
 action in joule-seconds
s represents:
an arclength
a path length
the displacement in mechanics equations
the unit second of time
a complex variable s = σ + i t in analytic number theory
the semiperimeter of a triangle or other polygon
𝒮 represents a system's action in physics

Tt
T represents:
the top element of a lattice
a tree (a special kind of graph)
temperature in physics equations
the unit tesla of magnetic flux density
the unit prefix tera (1012)
the stress–energy tensor
tension in physics
an arbitrary monad
the time it takes for one oscillation
kinetic energy
Torque
t represents:
time in graphs, functions or equations
a term in a sequence or series (e.g. tn = tn−1 + 5)
the imaginary part of the complex variable s = σ + it  in analytic number theory
the sample statistic resulting from a Student's t-test
the half life of a quantity, denoted as t1⁄2

Uu
U represents:
a U-set which is a set of uniqueness
a unitary operator
in thermodynamics, the internal energy of a system
a forgetful functor
U(n) represents the unitary group of degree n
∪ represents the union operator
u represents the initial velocity in mechanics equations

Vv
V represents:
the unit volt of voltage
the set of vertices in a graph
a vector space
potential energy
molar volume denoted by Vm
v represents
the final velocity in mechanics equations
frequency, especially when referring to electromagnetic waves
a specific volume in classical mechanics
the rate of concentration change of B (due to chemical reaction) denoted vB
the rate of reaction based on amount concentration denoted v or vc
the rate of reaction based on number concentration denoted v or vC

Ww
W represents:
the unit watt of power
work, both mechanical and thermodynamical
in thermodynamics, the number of possible quantum states in Boltzmann's entropy formula
weight measured in newtons
w represents:
 the coordinate on the fourth axis in four-dimensional space
 work in classical mechanics

Xx
X represents
a random variable
a triangle center 
Ẋ represents
the rate of change of quantity X
x represents
a realized value of a random variable
an unknown variable, most often (but not always) from the set of real numbers, while a complex unknown would rather be called z, and an integer by a letter like m from the middle of the alphabet
the coordinate on the first or horizontal axis in a Cartesian coordinate system, or the viewport in a graph or window in computer graphics
a mole fraction

Yy
Y represents:
the unit prefix yotta- (1024)
Y represents:
a second random variable
y represents:
the unit prefix yocto- (10−24)
a realized value of a second random variable
a second unknown variable
the coordinate on the second or vertical axis (backward axis in three dimensions) in a Cartesian coordinate system, or in the viewport of a graph or window in computer graphics
a mole fraction

Zz
Z represents:
the unit prefix zetta (1021)
the atomic number or proton number of an element in chemistry
a standardized normal random variable in probability theory and statistics
The partition function in statistical mechanics
in meteorology, the radar reflectivity factor
 represents the integers
z represents:
the unit prefix zepto (10−21)
the coordinate on the third or vertical axis in three dimensional space
the view depth in computer graphics, see also "z-buffering"
the argument of a complex function, or any other variable used to represent a complex value
 in astronomy, wavelength redshift
a third unknown variable
the collision frequency of A with A is denoted zA(A)
the collision frequency factor is denoted zAB

See also 
 Blackboard bold letters used in mathematics
 Greek letters used in mathematics, science, and engineering
 List of letters used in mathematics and science
 Mathematical Alphanumeric Symbols
 Glossary of mathematical symbols

References

Elementary mathematics